Shenna is a given name and surname. Notable people with the name include:

 Shenna Bellows (born 1975), American politician
 Leila Shenna, Moroccan former actress

See also
 Shanna (disambiguation)
 Sheena (disambiguation)
 Henner

Feminine given names
Surnames of African origin